Rockfield is a hamlet in the parish of Tarbat, on the Tarbat Peninsula,  near the village of Portmahomack, Easter Ross, Highland, Scotland. There is a small stone jetty and the traditional way of life included fishing and agriculture. Rockfield is generally east-facing, below the level of a raised beach.

Coastal Walks 
Rockfield is a good place to start or finish a coastal walk.  In a south-south-west direction you can walk from Rockfield to the Seaboard Village of Balintore.  In a north-north-east direction you can walk from Rockfield to Tarbat Ness, round the headland and return to Portmahomack on the other side of the peninsula.

Rockfield to Balintore 
This walk places the Moray Firth on your left with the opportunity to observe dolphins and occasional whales.  The distance is reported as 8.5 km with modest changes in elevation.

Rockfield to Tarbat Ness and on to Portmahomack 
This walk may be broken into two halves.  The first half, from Rockfield to Tarbat Ness is in a general north-north-west direction with the Moray Firth on the right-hand side. At Tarbat Ness, you can break your walk by viewing the Tarbat Lighthouse and tide pools.  A road runs to the Lighthouse and an old salmon station.

The second half of the walk is on the opposite side of the Tarbat peninsula.  You will be walking in a general south-south-west direction with more protected arm of the sea to your right-hand side.  The walk ends in the village of Portmahomack.

External links 

Populated places in Ross and Cromarty